William W. Knight (June 11, 1913 – February 1, 1987) was a Democratic member of the Pennsylvania House of Representatives.

References

Democratic Party members of the Pennsylvania House of Representatives
1987 deaths
1913 births
20th-century American politicians